The Marshalltown Formation is a Mesozoic geologic formation. Dinosaur remains diagnostic to the genus level are among the fossils that have been recovered from the formation.

Dinosaurs known from the formation:

 Hypsibema crassicauda
 Hadrosaurus sp.
 Nodosauridae indet.
 Dryptosaurus sp.
 Tyrannosauroidea indet.
 Dromeosauridae indet.
 Theropoda indet.

See also

 List of dinosaur-bearing rock formations
 List of stratigraphic units with few dinosaur genera

Footnotes

References
 Weishampel, David B.; Dodson, Peter; and Osmólska, Halszka (eds.): The Dinosauria, 2nd, Berkeley: University of California Press. 861 pp. .

Campanian Stage
Cretaceous geology of New Jersey
Cretaceous Delaware